Sparganothina ternaria is a species of moth of the family Tortricidae. It is found in Sinaloa, Mexico.

The length of the forewings is 8.2-8.9 mm. The ground colour of the forewings is yellowish orange with brown markings and a few orange scales. The hindwings are white.

Etymology
The species name refers to the transtilla, which bears three sets of stripes and is derived from Latin ternarius (meaning consisting of three).

References

Moths described in 2001
Sparganothini